Roxbert Martin (born 5 November 1969 in Saint Ann, Jamaica) is a former Jamaican 400 metres runner, who was selected for the Jamaican 4x400 metres relay team at the 1996 Summer Olympics and won a bronze medal. He was part of the gold-medal-winning relay team at the 1998 Commonwealth Games, setting the championship record.

His personal best time is 44.49 seconds, achieved in June 1997 in Kingston. This was the Jamaican record at the time but has since been broken by Jermaine Gonzales in 44.40 seconds in Monaco on 22 July 2010.

References

External links

sports-reference

1969 births
Living people
People from Saint Ann Parish
Jamaican male sprinters
Athletes (track and field) at the 1995 Pan American Games
Athletes (track and field) at the 1996 Summer Olympics
Athletes (track and field) at the 1994 Commonwealth Games
Athletes (track and field) at the 1998 Commonwealth Games
Olympic athletes of Jamaica
Olympic bronze medalists for Jamaica
Commonwealth Games medallists in athletics
Medalists at the 1996 Summer Olympics
Commonwealth Games gold medallists for Jamaica
Pan American Games silver medalists for Jamaica
Olympic bronze medalists in athletics (track and field)
Pan American Games medalists in athletics (track and field)
Medalists at the 1995 Pan American Games
Central American and Caribbean Games medalists in athletics
20th-century Jamaican people
21st-century Jamaican people
Medallists at the 1994 Commonwealth Games
Medallists at the 1998 Commonwealth Games